, "wai wai" being a Japanese onomatopoeia for a noisy, crowded area, is a 1988 Family Computer platform video game released only in Japan by Konami. The game itself stars various Konami-created characters as well as Mikey (from The Goonies) and King Kong, who appeared in two Konami-produced, movie-based games.

Gameplay
The player starts the game as Konami Man and can switch between Konami Man and Konami Lady. If two players are gaming, then one will play as Konami Man and the other as Konami Lady. Both players are not able to switch characters until they rescue at least one character from one of the six levels. The player must play through six different selectable levels that take place in different Konami games. Subsequently the player uses a key to save that game's star character, who then becomes playable. Each character has different abilities to begin with as well as ones they can eventually gain. The player ventures through these first six levels in a sort of nonlinear fashion with gameplay very similar to the original Castlevania games. After these stages are completed, the player plays through a scrolling space shooter stage and then a linear final stage.

The player can also regularly visit the lab of Dr. Cinnamon (from the TwinBee series), who gives the player the game's character profiles and refills energy when needed. Through his lab, the player can also talk to Saimon, Dr. Cinnamon's brother, who can resurrect any defeated characters at the cost of 100 bullets per character during the game.

Playable characters
Konami Man: The game's main protagonist who only made cameos in Konami games before this game.
Konami Lady: A female android created by Dr. Cinnamon to fight with Konami Man.
Goemon: This ninja from the Ganbare Goemon series is found in the Medieval Japan level.
Simon Belmont III: The descendant of the Vampire Killer from the Castlevania series is found in the Castle level.
Getsu Fūma: He is from the Famicom game released only in Japan, Getsu Fūma Den. He is found in the Underworld (or Hell) level.
Michael "Mikey" Walsh: The lead character in The Goonies film and the Famicom games, The Goonies (sold in retail only in Japan) and The Goonies II; he is found in the Cave level.
Moai Alexandria: Numerous Moai are usually enemies in the Gradius series and a playable character in Moai-kun; he is found in the Easter Island Temple.
King Kong: From the Japan-only Famicom game King Kong 2: Ikari no Megaton Punch which was based on the film King Kong Lives (King Kong 2 in Japan). He is found in the City level.
Upa: The baby protagonist from Bio Miracle Bokutte Upa who only appears in the mobile phone version as a replacement for Mikey. He is found in the Candy level.
Penta: The main protagonist from Antarctic Adventure and a father of Pentarou who only appears in the mobile phone version as a replacement for King Kong. He is found in the Antarctic level.
Vic Viper: The spaceship from the Gradius series. The player can only play this ship in the shooter stage.
TwinBee: From the TwinBee series. Like the Vic Viper, the player can only play this ship in the shooter stage.

Other characters
Dr. Cinnamon: Scientist from the TwinBee series, helps the characters throughout the game.
Saimon: Dr. Cinnamon's brother who brings defeated characters back to life. 
Pentarou: Penguin from the Parodius series, (the son of Penta, who originally appeared in Antarctic Adventure), transports the player to one of the six main levels.
Hanako: Penguin from the Parodius series, replacing Pentarou (in the mobile phone version).

Music
The music during gameplay depends on which character the player is currently playing as. Each character has their own music, which serves as their theme song. Besides Konami Man, Konami Girl and Moai, all the other characters use music from the Konami games they starred in. The different boss music in the game is also taken from Konami games in which the level is based.

Mobile phone version
The mobile phone version of Wai Wai World replaces Mikey and King Kong with Upa (from Bio Miracle Bokutte Upa) and a giant Penta (the protagonist from Antarctic Adventure, and father of Pentarou), with their respective stages being a Candy stage and an Antarctic stage. These two characters from the original Famicom version had been omitted due to licensing issues.

Bosses
Giant one-eyed frog, found in the Castlevania stage.
Giant Kong robot, found in the King Kong stage.
Giant Shark, found in the Antarctic Adventure stage.
Skeleton dragon, found in the Getsu Fuma Den stage.
Giant Moai Head, found in the Easter Island stage.
Woman's head, found in the overhead shoot 'em up stage.
Giant alien head, found in the overhead shoot 'em up stage.

Soundtrack 
 was released on a soundtrack CD on May 19, 2014 in Japan and was published by Eg Music Records and D4 Enterprise.

Other games
 Parodius series:?
 Hai no Majutsushi: A 1989 Mahjong game for MSX2 featuring eight Konami mascots.
 Wai Wai World 2: SOS!! Parsley Jō: The 1991 sequel for the Famicom.
 Wai Wai Bingo: A 1993 Bingo game starring Konami characters for the Medal Game.
 Piccadilly Circus: Konami Wai Wai World: A 1994 Roullette-themed game starring Konami characters for Redemption Game.
 Wai Wai Jockey: A 1995 Jockey game starring Konami characters for the Medal Game.
 Wai Wai Poker: A 1997 Poker game starring Konami characters for the Medal Game.
 Jikkyō Power Pro Wrestling '96: Max Voltage: A 1996 wrestling video game for Super Famicom.
 Speed King NEO KOBE 2045: The 1996 futuristic racing video game for PlayStation where nearly all the machines are named after classic Konami games.
 Konami Wai Wai Racing Advance (known as Konami Krazy Racers in the U.S.): A 2001 racing game starring some of the Wai Wai World cast for the Game Boy Advance.
 DreamMix TV World Fighters:
 Airforce Delta Strike: The 2004 flight simulator video game for PlayStation 2 and the third in the series, the player can unlock the Konami characters to complete the missions.
 Konami Wai Wai Sokoban: The 2006 puzzle game for mobile phones.
 Otomedius: ?
 Super Bomberman R: 2017's Maze Action game for Nintendo Switch, features a DLC update, with various playable characters from other Konami franchises.
 Pixel Puzzle Collection: 2018's Picross game for iPhone OS and Android, which features Konami characters as Classics.

References

External links
Official site for the mobile phone version (Japanese)

1988 video games
Crossover video games
Japan-exclusive video games
Konami franchises
Wai Wai World
Mobile games
Nintendo Entertainment System games
Video games featuring female protagonists
Multiplayer and single-player video games
Video games developed in Japan